Kalateh-ye Mehrak (also Romanized as Kalāteh-ye Mehrak; also known as Mehrak) is a village in Zirkuh Rural District, Central District, Zirkuh County, South Khorasan Province, Iran. At the 2006 census, its population was 184, in 42 families.

References 

Populated places in Zirkuh County